Skappel is a surname. Notable people with the surname include:

Dorthe Skappel, Norwegian journalist and television personality
Helge Skappel, Norwegian aviator, photographer, and cartographer
Simen Skappel, Norwegian historian and statistician
Øivin Skappel Fjeldstad, Norwegian banker and politician